Llívia is a town in the comarca of Cerdanya, province of Girona, Catalonia, Spain. It is a Spanish exclave surrounded by the French département of Pyrénées-Orientales. In 2009, the municipality of Llívia had a total population of 1,589. The Segre river, a tributary of the Spanish Ebro, flows through Llívia.

History

Llívia was the site of an Iberian oppidum that commanded the region and was named Julia Lybica by the Romans. It was the capital of Cerdanya in antiquity, before being replaced by Hix (commune of Bourg-Madame, France) in the Middle Ages. During the Visigothic period, its citadel, the castrum Libiae, was held by the rebel Paul of Narbonne against King Wamba in 672. As the "town (or 'city') of Cerdanya," 8th century Llívia may also have been the scene of the siege by which governor Abdul Rahman Al Ghafiqi of Muslim Spain rid himself of the Moorish (Berber) rebel Uthman ibn Naissa ("Munnuza"), who had allied himself with Duke Eudo of Aquitaine to improve the chances of his rebellion, ahead of the Battle of Tours (732 or 733), also known as the Battle of Poitiers.

Following the Franco-Spanish War (1635–1659), the Treaty of the Pyrenees in 1659 ceded the comarques of Roussillon, Conflent, Capcir, Vallespir, and northern Cerdanya ("Cerdagne") to the French Crown. The treaty thus established the Pyrenees as the border between France and Spain, while separating Northern Catalonia from Catalonia.  However, the treaty stipulated that only villages were to be ceded to France, and Llívia was considered a town (vila in Catalan), since it had the status of the ancient capital of Cerdanya.  So Llívia remained a Spanish enclave within France and did not become part of the Kingdom of France.  This situation was confirmed in the subsequent Treaty of Llívia, signed in 1660.

Under the fascist government of Francisco Franco, residents required special passes to cross France to the rest of Spain. Today, with these countries in the Schengen Area, there are no frontier formalities and cross-border infrastructure is the only issue. The two countries share a hospital in Llívia, as well as other local initiatives.

The enclave is accessible from Spain via a 1.8 km long road that up until the implementation of the Schengen Area in 1995 was considered a "neutral road" as defined in the Treaty of Llivia. The road was designated as being a custom-free route across which the French were allowed free access from one part of the corridor to another and for the Spanish to travel freely between Puigcerdà and Llivia. This road is the joint property of Spain and France and is designated in Spain as part of the N-154 and in France as jointly part of the Route nationale 20 and the RD68. The road has been the subject of controversy over the years, particularly due to a number of stop signs placed by the French authorities and removed overnight by those opposed to them. This lasted for several years and became known as the war of the stop signs.

During the vote for Catalan independence in 2017, 561 out of 591 votes cast in Llívia were in favor of independence. The referendum was deemed illegal by the Spanish courts, but the Spanish police did not intervene to stop the vote in the town.

Museum

The Esteve Pharmacy, located in Llívia's municipal museum, is a complete 18th-century pharmacy donated to the town by the family who owned it, on condition the contents remain in the town. There are records of pharmacists practising in Llívia since medieval times. The pharmacy has a large display of albarelli, a type of ceramic jar used in pharmacies, as well as antique drugs, and one of the most important collections of prescription books in Europe.

Education

Escola Jaume I is located in Llívia. It was built in the 1950s.  a new school was constructed with a  ground floor and a  second floor.

References

External links
 
 Official site
 Government data pages 

Municipalities in Cerdanya (comarca)
Municipalities in the Province of Girona
France–Spain border
Enclaves and exclaves
Populated places in the Province of Girona